Marlborough Road is a disused London Underground station in St John's Wood, north-west London. It opened in April 1868 on the Metropolitan & St. John's Wood Railway, the first northward extension from Baker Street of the Metropolitan Railway (now the Metropolitan line).

In the mid-1930s the Metropolitan line was suffering congestion at the south end of its main route, where trains from its many branches shared the limited capacity between Finchley Road and Baker Street. To ease this congestion, new deep-level tunnels were constructed between Finchley Road and the Bakerloo line tunnels at Baker Street; then, commencing on 20 November 1939, the Metropolitan's services toward Stanmore were transferred to the Bakerloo line (they are now on the Jubilee line) and ran to Baker Street through the new tunnels.

Upon the transfer, Marlborough Road station was closed and replaced by St John's Wood station, then on the Bakerloo line; it had been little used, except (owing to its close proximity to Lord's Cricket Ground) during the cricket season.

Shots of the remains of the platforms, and an outside shot of the station building and booking hall—which at the time was in use as a steak restaurant—were included in Metro-Land, a 1973 documentary presented by John Betjeman. The building housed a Chinese restaurant until 2009 and now contains a substation installed as part of the power upgrade programme to support the introduction of S stock on the Metropolitan line.

Marlborough Road itself was renamed Marlborough Place in the 1950s.

See also
Other Metropolitan line stations that closed with the opening of the new Bakerloo tunnels:
Swiss Cottage
Lord's

References

External links 

  "Marlborough Road", Hidden London Hangouts  #3.08, London Transport Museum via YouTube, 27 February 2021

Metropolitan line stations
Disused London Underground stations
Disused railway stations in the City of Westminster
Former Metropolitan Railway stations
Railway stations in Great Britain opened in 1868
Railway stations in Great Britain closed in 1939
St John's Wood